Mount Matier is a prominent  mountain summit located in the Coast Mountains, in Joffre Lakes Provincial Park, in southwestern British Columbia, Canada. It is the highest point of the Joffre Group, which is a subset range of the Coast Mountains. Its nearest higher peak is Mount Weart,  to the southwest. The slopes of the mountain are covered by the Matier Glacier on the northwest, Anniversary Glacier on the northeast, Twin One Glacier on the southeast, and Hartzell Glacier to the south. Precipitation runoff from the peak drains into Joffre Creek and Twin One Creek, both tributaries of the Lillooet River.

The first ascent of the mountain was made on August 18, 1957, by Dick Chambers, Joe Hutton, Roy Mason, Paddy Sherman, and Cyril Scott, who were members of the British Columbia Mountaineering Club. The mountain's name honors Tom Matier, an early well-known prospector in the area. Its name was officially adopted on April 21, 1966, by the Geographical Names Board of Canada.

Climate
Based on the Köppen climate classification, Mount Matier is located in a subarctic climate zone of western North America. Most weather fronts originate in the Pacific Ocean, and travel east toward the Coast Mountains where they are forced upward by the range (Orographic lift), causing them to drop their moisture in the form of rain or snowfall. As a result, the Coast Mountains experience high precipitation, especially during the winter months in the form of snowfall. Temperatures can drop below −20 °C with wind chill factors below −30 °C. The months July through September offer the most favorable weather for climbing Matier.

Climbing Routes
Established climbing routes on Mount Matier:
 North Ridge -  rock, via Anniversary Glacier   
 West Face -  rock, via Matier Glacier

See also

 Geography of British Columbia
 Geology of British Columbia

References

Gallery

External links
 Climbing Matier in winter: YouTube
 Mt. Matier weather: Mountain Forecast

Two-thousanders of British Columbia
Lillooet Ranges
Lillooet Land District